Abdesalam Bennuna was a Moroccan man of letters. He is described as the "father of Moroccan nationalism."

He cofounded al-Hurriya ( Freedom), an arabophone newspaper, with Abdelkhalek Torres. 

He corresponded with Shakib Arslan.

Drawing inspiration from the Alliance Israélite Universelle and the school it established in Tetuan in 1862, he contacted scholars, faqīhs, and literary figures in Morocco and established the Moroccan Scientific Society on December 30, 1916.

Along with Mohammed Daoud, Bennouna formed the group al Muslihun (the Reformers) in 1926.

During Spanish rule of Morocco, Bennouna called for democratic reforms for Moroccans. Initially, Bennouna did not demand independence or autonomy, but reforms of colonial rule such as elected municipal councils, a general council, press freedoms, freedom of association, improved educational system, Moroccan access to administrative posts and anti-poverty measures.

References 

Newspaper publishers (people)
People from Tétouan
Reformers
Moroccan nationalists
1888 births
1935 deaths